Augie Duke (born 1986) is an American actress who is known for starring roles in Bad Kids Go to Hell and the television series Chemistry.

Filmography 

Gravity (2010, 4 episodes)
Chemistry (2011, 9 episodes)
Teenage Bank Heist (2012)
Bad Kids Go to Hell (2012)
Spring (2014)
Criminal Minds (2015)
The Badger Game (2015)
The Black Room (2017)
 Burning Kentucky  (2019)
Blood Craft  (2019)
The Narcissists (2019)
Trauma is a Time Machine (2019)
Exit 0 (2019)
Antidote (2021)
6:45 (2021)

Awards

References

External links 
 

Living people
American film actresses
1986 births
21st-century American women